Centrum Lake (also known as Centrum Sø), is a lake in King Frederick VIII Land, near Greenland's northeastern coast. The lake and its surroundings are part of the Northeast Greenland National Park zone.

History
The lake was first observed by Lauge Koch in 1938 during an aerial survey. It was named in 1952-53 when it was chosen as a center for geological research in which Catalina planes could land. Huts were built and scientific personnel used the location as a base for research in the area, as well as to launch expeditions further north.

In 1955 it was considered as a possible site for a military base in Greenland. Currently there is a STOL airstrip near the lake.

Geography
Centrum Lake is a land-locked freshwater lake with a fjord structure. It is located at the southern end of Crown Prince Christian Land peninsula. The Sæfaxi Elv, a short river, discharges its waters eastwards in the Marmorvigen, a small branch in the western shore of the Hekla Sound, a little to the north of the confluence with the Dijmphna Sound. There are caves in the area of the lake.
 
Sydhøjen is a small peninsula on the northern side of the lake which has Inuit archaeological remains.

Bibliography
Needleman, S.M. (ed.) 1962: Arctic earth science investigations, Centrum Sø, northeast Greenland, 1960. Air Force Surveys Geo physics 138, 132 pp.

See also
List of fjords of Greenland
List of research stations in the Arctic

References

External links 
Can You Dig It? Arctic Explorers Find Buried Stash of 60 Year-Old Jam
Report on the findings of the Northeast Greenland Caves Project 2015
Investigations of ice-free sites for aircraft landings in east Greenland
Research stations in Greenland
Arctic research
Lakes of Greenland